Charles Harold Athill, MVO, FSA (1853–1922) was a long-serving officer of arms at the College of Arms in London.  He began his heraldic career by joining the College of Arms in 1882 as Bluemantle Pursuivant of Arms in Ordinary.  The position lasted until 1889, when he was appointed Richmond Herald of Arms in Ordinary. On 23 January 1919, Athill was made Norroy King of Arms to when Sir Henry Farnham Burke was promoted from that position to Garter Principal King of Arms. Later that year, Athill was promoted to the office of Clarenceux King of Arms on the death Sir William Weldon.  Athill held this office until his own death in 1922.

Arms

See also 
 Herald
 King of Arms
 Pursuivant

References

External links 
 The College of Arms
 CUHAGS Officers of Arms Index

1853 births
1922 deaths
English officers of arms
Fellows of the Society of Antiquaries of London
Members of the Royal Victorian Order